The 2016 Christchurch mayoral election was part of the New Zealand local elections held on 8 October. The incumbent mayor, former Labour MP and government Minister Lianne Dalziel, who was first elected in the 2013 mayoral election was reelected, winning a commanding 83.9% of formal votes cast in the poll. However New Zealand's local government elections in 2016 were characterized by a nationwide low participation rate which saw only 41.8% of enrolled voters cast a ballot in the election. Christchurch's turnout rate was particularly low with only 38.3% of enrolled voters actually voting, down from 52.2% in 2010.

Candidates
There were three candidates:

 Lianne Dalziel (Best for Christchurch), incumbent, who formally declared her intention to run for a second term on 25 April.
 Tubby Hansen (Economic Euthenics), perennial candidate
 John Minto (Keep Our Assets), veteran political activist, who announced his candidacy on 12 July

The left-leaning ticket, The People's Choice, represented on the outgoing city council by six councillors, declared that they would not stand a candidate in opposition to Dalziel – and councillor Paul Lonsdale, who came second in the 2013 mayoral campaign, acknowledged that Dalziel had done well in her first term and that he would not challenge her.

Debates
The Press hosted a debate between Dalziel and Minto at the Cardboard Cathedral on 20 September, moderated by its editor, Joanna Norris. The following day, Guyon Espiner interviewed Dalziel and Minto on RNZ National's Morning Report.

Generation Zero hosted a debate at the University of Canterbury's Ilam campus on 22 September 2016.

Results

By ward
Source:

References

Mayoral elections in Christchurch
2016 elections in New Zealand
Politics of Christchurch
2010s in Christchurch
October 2016 events in New Zealand